Acacia aneura var. intermedia is a perennial shrub or tree native to Australia.

This variety is a form of the Mulga, Acacia aneura, a relatively long-lived species of genus Acacia.

See also
 List of Acacia species

References

External links
 Flora of Australia Volume 11B (2001) figure 67.
  Acacia aneura

aneura var. intermedia
Inter
Flora of New South Wales
Flora of the Northern Territory
Flora of Queensland
Flora of South Australia
Acacias of Western Australia
Shrubs
Drought-tolerant trees
Trees of Australia
Taxa named by Leslie Pedley